Lyepyel or Lepel is a town in Vitebsk Region, Belarus, located near Lyepyel Lake. It serves as the administrative center of Lyepyel District.

The coat of arms of Lyepyel incorporates the Pahonia symbol.

Name 

There are three theories about the origin of the name Lepel.  The first is that the name 'Lepel' come from the word "lepene" which means "lake between the lime-groves". The second is that the name comes from the Belarusian word "лепей" meaning "the best place to live in". The third theory for the name Lepel is that it derives from the Belarusian word "ляпiць" meaning "well-developed pottery".

History 
The first known mention of Lepel dates back to 1439.  In the 15th century, the town belonged to the Lithuanian Grand Duchy. In 1439, thanks to efforts of a Roman Catholic priest, Kucharski, Grand Lithuanian Duke Sigismund Kęstutaitis' son Michael gave Lepel to the Vitebsk Roman Catholic church.  King Sigismund I the Old subsequently confirmed the gift and in 1541 by approbation of pontiff, the townlands were given to the Vitebsk Cathedral.

After Polatsk was captured by the Russian army in 1563, the Vitebsk government was no longer able to protect its property from the attacks of the Grand Duchy of Moscow.  The decision was made to donate Lepel to King Sigismund II Augustus on the erroneous assumption that the king would return the gift by awarding the Vitebsk government with other property of the same value. Instead, the king gave the property by way of life tenure to Yury Zenovich, the mayor of Smolensk. After Yury Zenovich died, Sigismund gave the town to Michael Daragastaisky and it then came into the hands of Stefan Batory.  Batory eventually returned the property to the Vitebsk government when Polatsk was liberated. It remained difficult for the Vitebsk authorities to protect their holdings in Lepel and thus the decision was made in 1586 to sell the townlands to Lew Sapieha, a leading politician. Sapieha eventually donated Lepel in 1609 to Bernardine nuns in Vilnius (Wilno) who lived next to St. Michael's Church.

After the annexation of Belarus to Russia in 1772, Lepel remained in Lithuania due to the border being traced by the river Dvina.   After the second division of the Polish–Lithuanian Commonwealth in 1793, Lepel was annexed by Russia and in 1802 the town became the center of the region. The town suffered greatly in the 1812 French invasion of Russia due to the passing troops razing many buildings to the ground.  On 9 September 1852 Lepel was awarded its own coat of arms.  Jan Czeczot worked as an engineer on the Berezina Canal in Lepel between 1833 and 1839. In 1880, the population of Lepel consisted of 5,284 people, including 2,458 Jews, 2,281 Orthodox, and 536 Roman Catholics.

By 1913 Lepel had lost its strategic and economic importance and was a quiet regional town center.

On November 10, 1919 in the neighbourhood of Lepel there was a clash between the company of the 13th infantry regiment of the Polish Army sitting in an ambush and the Soviet troops advancing into the region. The fighting was successful for the Poles though their commanding officer, lieutenant Stanisław Jacheć, was the only Polish victim of the clash. Heavy fighting between the Bolshevik troops and the Polish Army's 30th regiment of the Rifles of Kaniów of the XX brigade continued through November 1919 and the Polish-Soviet frontline was established there until spring 1920.

On 22 June 1941, Operation Barbarossa, the German invasion of the Soviet Union, began. Lepiel was captured by the rapidly advancing German troops on 3 July. While the Lepel's Jewish population had once been as high as 3,379 (53.7%) in 1897, by 1941 this had dwindled to only 1,919, or 13.6 percent of the townspeople. The German occupation authorities created a ghetto and appointed a Jewish elder.  On February 28, 1942, almost all of the 1,000 residents remaining in the ghetto were shot by an Einsatzgruppe. During Operation Bagration, the summer 1944 Soviet strategic offensive in Belarus, Lepiel was liberated on 3 July.

Education 
Lepel has:
 4 secondary schools
 An agrotechnical college
 A professional college

Transportation 
Lepel is situated on a highway connecting Minsk and Vitebsk, and is 115 km from Vitebsk and 155 km from Minsk. The town is connected by road to Polatsk and by rail to Orsha.

Notable people
People from Lyepyel:
Yawhen Kalinin (born 1993), footballer
Ivan Matskevich (born 1991), handballer
Anastasiya Mazgo (born 1995), handballer
Vladimir Motyl (1927-2010), director
Yauheni Zharnasek (born 1987), weightlifter

References

External links 
 Photos on Radzima.org
 Unofficial site
 History of the town, community
 Lepel in Geographical Dictionary of Polish Kingdom and Other Slavic Countries(Polish)
 The murder of the Jews of Lepiel during World War II, at Yad Vashem website
 

Towns in Belarus
Populated places in Vitebsk Region
Polotsk Voivodeship
Lepelsky Uyezd
Holocaust locations in Belarus